A mail-order bride is a woman who advertises her willingness to marry internationally to better her standard of living.

Mail Order Bride may also refer to:

Mail Order Bride (1964 film), starring Keir Dullea, Lois Nettleton, and Buddy Ebsen
Mail Order Bride (1984 film), a 1984 Australian television film
Mail Order Bride (2008 film), a Hallmark Channel made-for-TV movie starring Daphne Zuniga
Mail Order Brides (artist collaborative), a Filipina American artist trio
"Mail Order Bride", a song on the album Drowning in the Fountain of Youth by Dan Kelly & The Alpha Males
"Mail Order Bride", an episode of the first season of Aqua Teen Hunger Force
"Mail Order Annie", a song by the late American Performer Harry Chapin about an incident that may have occurred in North Dakota in 1830